The Syrian coup d'état may refer to:

The March 1949 Syrian coup d'état
The 1954 Syrian coup d'état
The 1961 Syrian coup d'état
The 1963 Syrian coup d'état
The 1966 Syrian coup d'état
The 1970 Syrian Corrective Revolution